Edward George Wright (14 June 1831 – 12 August 1902) was an independent conservative Member of Parliament in New Zealand.

Biography

Wright was born in Woolwich, Kent, England, in 1831. After an education in private schools, he worked for Fox, Henderson and Co. He was the engineer for the gasworks in Rome and then worked on the naval dockyards at Royal Arsenal in Woolwich and then Aldershot. He married in September 1854 at London and went to New Zealand with his wife and their first two sons in 1857, with another one born in their chosen country.

In Canterbury, he was responsible for many of the engineering works, especially bridges.

He represented the Coleridge electorate from 1879 to 1881, then the Ashburton electorate from 1881 to 16 May 1884, when he resigned.

He retired at the end of the parliamentary term in 1899.

Wright was chairman of the Lyttelton Harbour Board for four periods.

Wright died at his homestead Windermere, after which a locality between Hinds and Winslow is named, on 12 August 1902. He was survived by his wife and five children. He was buried at Windermere Church.

References

|-

|-

1831 births
1902 deaths
Members of the New Zealand House of Representatives
New Zealand engineers
People from Woolwich
People from Ashburton, New Zealand
Unsuccessful candidates in the 1887 New Zealand general election
Unsuccessful candidates in the 1893 New Zealand general election
New Zealand MPs for South Island electorates
English emigrants to New Zealand
19th-century New Zealand politicians
19th-century New Zealand engineers
Local politicians in New Zealand
Lyttelton Harbour Board members